Keshem or Kishim is a town and seat of Kishim District in Badakhshan Province in north-eastern Afghanistan. It lies on the road from Taloqan to Faizabad.

References

External links
Satellite map at Maplandia.com

Populated places in Kishim District